Autocrates is a genus of beetles in the Trictenotomidae family with species across the Indomalayan realm. They are sexually dimorphic with males having longer and more sinuate mandibles.

Species
Six species have been described:
 Autocrates aeneus  - Himalayas from India to China
 Autocrates ivanovi  - Vietnam
 Autocrates lini  - China
 Autocrates maqueti  - China, Korea
 Autocrates oberthueri  - Tibet, China
 Autocrates vitalisi  - Vietnam, Cambodia, China (Guangdong, Guangxi, Hainan, Sichuan, Xizang (Tibet),  Yunnan), Laos, Thailand, West Malaysia, Myanmar

References

Tenebrionoidea genera
Trictenotomidae